Lem Harkey Jr. (January 7, 1934 – July 3, 2004) was an American football fullback.  He played for San Francisco 49ers in 1955.  He played college football for the College of Emporia Fighting Presbies in Emporia, Kansas.

In college, Harkey was all-conference and all-American at College of Emporia as a fullback and averaged 8.2 yards per carry through all his college years.  In 1953, his senior year, he led the nation with 168 yards per game.

References

External links
 

1934 births
2004 deaths
American football fullbacks
College of Emporia Fighting Presbies football players
San Francisco 49ers players
Sportspeople from Oklahoma City
Players of American football from Oklahoma